In phonetics and phonology, nonexplosive stops are posited class of non-pulmonic ("non-obstruent") stop consonants that lack the pressure build-up and burst release associated with pulmonic stops, but also the laryngeal lowering of implosive stops. They are reported to occur in Ikwere, an Igboid (Niger–Congo) language of Nigeria.

Ikwere's stops resemble both, in that they are velarized and have a non-pulmonic airstream mechanism.

References

Plosives